The 1996 1. divisjon, Norway's second-tier football league, began play on 28 April 1996 and ended on 29 September 1996. The league was contested by 24 teams, divided in two groups and the winner of each group won promotion to Tippeligaen, while the runners-up played a promotion-playoff to win promotion. This was the last season that this league was divided into two groups, so bottom six teams was relegated to 2. divisjon, while the sixth-placed team place a play-off against the winners of the group-winners in the 2. divisjon.

Lyn and Haugesund won promotion to Tippeligaen as group-winners, while Sogndal was promoted after beating Odd in the promotion play-off. Jevnaker, Tromsdalen, Ullern, Elverum, Stålkameratene, Mjøndalen, Fana, Strindheim, Nardo, Vidar, Åsane and Fyllingen was relegated to the Second Division, while Harstad and Byåsen avoided relegation through after winning the playoff.

League tables

Group 1

Group 2

Top goalscorers

21 goals:
Vegard Berg Johansen, Tromsdalen
20 goals:
Atle Maurud, Ham Kam
15 goals:
Jo Tessem, Lyn
Kristian Klausen, Aalesund
15 goals:
Ole Halvor Kolstad, Odd
14 goals:
Tommy Nilsen, Lyn
Geir Televik, Hødd
11 goals:
Caleb Francis, Bryne
Kjell Sture Jensen, Haugesund
Tom Helge Jacobsen, Eik
Rune Lange, Tromsdalen

See also
 1996 Tippeligaen
 1996 2. divisjon
 1996 3. divisjon

References

Norwegian First Division seasons
2
Norway
Norway